The Kharkov electoral district was a constituency created for the 1917 Russian Constituent Assembly election. The electoral district covered the Kharkov Governorate.

The official Socialist-Revolutionary Party list in Kharkov was dominated by the left-wing faction of the party, contesting jointly with the Ukrainian Socialist-Revolutionary Party. This list, List no. 5, won an overwhelming victory; a predictable development as these groups heavily dominated the soviets in the area and played the most prominent role in the campaigning ahead of the polls. The list also carried an older narodniks' name of "Zemlia i volia" (see Land and Liberty (Russia)).

On July 25, 1917 the Kharkov Provincial Soviet of Peasants Deputies adopted a resolution, put forth by its Executive Committee, declaring that the Kharkov Soviet would not field a list of its own but ordered all local soviets to support the SR-Ukrainian SR list. The right-wing pro-war SR faction had its own list, a "garrison soldiers' and peasants' list", headed by E.K. Breshko-Breshkovskaia. The Kharkov Provincial Soviet Executive Committee denounced the right-wing SR list, declaring on October 13, 1917 that the Soviet would campaign against the list and that all of the candidates on the list as expelled from the Socialist-Revolutionary Party.

Whilst trailing far behind the SRs across the country-side, the Bolsheviks won the election in Kharkov city.

Results

References

Electoral districts of the Russian Constituent Assembly election, 1917
Kharkov Governorate
1910s elections in Ukraine